Şıxəmir (also, Şıxmir, Shikhamir, and Shykhamir) is a village in the Goychay Rayon of Azerbaijan. The village forms part of the municipality of Məlikkənd.

References 

Populated places in Goychay District